Hynhamia obscurana is a species of moth of the family Tortricidae. It is found in Ecuador.

The wingspan is 16 mm. The ground colour of the forewings is yellowish brown with a slight ferruginous admixture. The dots and suffusions are brown and the terminal area is suffused with dark brown. The markings are brown. The hindwings are brown.

Etymology
The species name refers to the dark colouration of the species and is derived from Latin obscurana (meaning dark).

References

Moths described in 2007
Hynhamia